Tom Hingley and the Lovers were a British alternative rock band formed by singer Tom Hingley (of Inspiral Carpets), brothers Steve Hanley (bass guitar) and Paul Hanley (drums) (both former members of The Fall), keyboardist Kelly Wood and guitarist Jason Brown. Brown was initially replaced by Rahman Baloch and Andrew Tarling joined on guitar in 2012 for their final dates. In September 2022 the band announced they were reforming with Jason Brown back on guitar for two one off shows in 2023 February 3rd AATMA in Manchester and February 4th at the 100 Club in London , the band have no intention of adding any more release or shows these two shows 

Their first album, Abba Are The Enemy, was released in 2004. The follow up, Highlights was released in March 2008.

Former members
Tom Hingley – vocals (2001–2013. 2023-)
Steve Hanley – bass (2001–2013. 2023-)
Paul Hanley – drums (2001–2013. 2023-)
Kelly Wood – keyboards (2001–2013. 2023-)
Jason Brown – guitar (2001–2011. 2023-)
Rahman Baloch – guitar (2011)
Andrew Tarling – guitar (2012–2013)

Discography
"Yeah" (single) – Newmemorabilia – 2003
Abba Are The Enemy – Newmemorabilia – 2004
Highlights – Newmemorabilia – 2008

Compilation tracks
 "Isolationtank" on Happiness by Tom Hingley, 2001, FFVinyl
 "Online Pharmacy" on Shake (VA), 2004, Biff Bang Pow
 "Boyband" on Out Of The Blue (VA), 2004,  Blue Cat

Interviews
Abba, Ken Dodd and Chris Martin – enter the world of The Lovers (BBC Interview + Audio), 2004
Loving it (BBC Interview with Tom Hingley), 2006

References

External links

The Lovers at Discogs

English punk rock groups
Musical groups from Manchester